Rubin Rafael Okotie (born 6 June 1987) is an Austrian professional footballer who plays as a forward. He is also a full Austrian international and represented the nation at the 2016 UEFA European Championship.

Having moved to Austria at the age of six, Okotie began his playing career with Austria Vienna. He made his professional debut in 2007 and went on to make over 50 appearances for the club before joining German side 1. FC Nürnberg. Okotie spent a season at Nürnberg, and another season on loan with Belgian side Sint-Truiden before returning to Austria to sign for Sturm Graz. A season-and-a-half later he returned to Austria Vienna where following which he had a loan stint with SønderjyskE in Denmark. In 2014 he signed for 1860 Munich where he scored 21 goals in 57 appearances before joining current employers, Beijing Enterprises.

Early life and career
Okotie was born in the Pakistani city of Karachi to an Austrian mother and Nigerian father. Soon after his birth, his family moved to Barcelona in Spain before immigrating to Vienna when he was four-years old. Okotie joined his first football club two years later before signing for the Rapid Vienna academy at the age of ten. Three years later, he left to join club rivals Austria Vienna, where he later made his professional debut.

Club career

Austria Vienna
Okotie quickly progressed through the Frank-Stronach-Fußballakademie at Austria Vienna and was  playing in the second division with the reserve side at the age of seventeen. In 2007, he made his professional debut for the club against SV Ried before scoring his first goal the following year in a 3–1 win over FC Red Bull Salzburg. At the end of his debut campaign with the club he was recognized with the Austrian Bundesliga's Young Star of the Season award. 

The following season he scored the opening goal in the 2008–09 Austrian Cup final to help Die Veilchen to a 3–1 victory over Trenkwalder Admira, and thereby claim the title. During the 2009–10 Austrian Football Bundesliga season, he suffered a serious knee injury which ruled him out for seven months, and limited him to just seven appearances for the season. During his time on the sidelines, Okotie was approached by 1. FC Nürnberg who assisted him in locating a doctor to help him in the recovery process and at the end of the season he signed for the German club, departing Austria with a return of 21 goals in 57 league appearances.

1. FC Nürnberg
On 30 May 2010, Okotie signed a three-year contract with 1. FC Nürnberg, who had secured promotion to the Bundesliga through the previous season's play-offs. He struggled at the club, however, due in part to injury and illness, and managed to feature in just four appearances during his debut season. He spent the following season on loan in Belgium with Sint-Truiden, where he scored once in ten appearances, before leaving to join Sturm Graz.

Sturm Graz
Okotie failed to feature for Nürnberg again following the expiration of his loan with Sint-Truiden and in January 2012 returned to Austria to join Sturm Graz, initially on a season-long loan. He scored two goals in thirteen appearances on loan before signing for the club permanently on a free transfer at the end of the season. He scored 12 goals across all competitions during the following season's campaign before leaving the club to rejoin Austria Vienna.

Return to Austria Vienna
Okotie returned to Austria Vienna ahead of the 2013–14 campaign but scored only once in thirteen appearances during the course of the season. Following discord with club manager Nenad Bjelica he left to join Danish side SønderjyskE on loan. He made 15 appearances during his spell in Denmark and scored eleven goals.

1860 Munich
After a loan spell with SønderjyskE expired, Okotie joined 2. Bundesliga side 1860 Munich on 2 July 2014 on a two-year contract. He spent two seasons with in Munich during which time he scored 25 goals in 64 appearances and proved to be a crucial player in the club's relegation survival in 2015.

Beijing Enterprises Group
In July 2016, Okotie joined China League One team Beijing Enterprises Group on a two-and-a-half-year deal. He scored three goals in 24 appearances over the next year-and-a-half before mutually terminating his contract with the club in February 2018.

International career

As a result of his multinational background, and prior to making his senior debut for Austria, Okotie was eligible to represent three countries at national level, namely Austria, Nigeria and Pakistan. Okotie identifies himself primarily as Austrian, however, stating in an interview with FIFA's website that "I live there, it's where I have my friends, and I think of myself as Austrian" .

Okotie represented Austria at various youth levels and featured for the nation at the 2006 European championships in Poland and the 2007 World Cup in Canada, where Austria reached the semi-finals. His senior debut followed in 2008 when he selected by manager Karel Bruckner for a match against Turkey. He was, however, left out of Austria's squad for the 2008 UEFA European Football Championship later that year. Austria failed to qualify for the 2010 FIFA World Cup and UEFA Euro 2012 tournaments but topped their qualifying group for UEFA Euro 2016. Okotie scored twice during qualifying, against Montenegro and Russia, and was later chosen for the tournament squad.

Career statistics

Club

International

Scores and results list Austria's goal tally first, score column indicates score after each Okotie goal.

Honours
Austria Vienna
 Austrian Cup: 2009

Austria U20
 U-20 World Cup: fourth place 2007

Austria U19
 U-19 European Championship: third place 2006

Individual
 Austria's Best Sportsteam of the Year: Austria U20 2007

References

External links
 
 

1987 births
Living people
Association football forwards
Austrian footballers
Austrian people of Nigerian descent
Austrian expatriate footballers
Austrian expatriate sportspeople in Germany
Austria youth international footballers
Austria under-21 international footballers
Austria international footballers
FK Austria Wien players
1. FC Nürnberg players
1. FC Nürnberg II players
Sint-Truidense V.V. players
SK Sturm Graz players
SønderjyskE Fodbold players
TSV 1860 Munich players
Beijing Sport University F.C. players
K Beerschot VA players
Expatriate footballers in Germany
Expatriate footballers in Belgium
Expatriate men's footballers in Denmark
Expatriate footballers in China
Austrian Football Bundesliga players
Bundesliga players
China League One players
2. Bundesliga players
Belgian Pro League players
Challenger Pro League players
Danish Superliga players
Footballers from Karachi
UEFA Euro 2016 players
Austrian expatriate sportspeople in Belgium
Austrian expatriate sportspeople in Denmark
Footballers from Vienna
Austrian expatriate sportspeople in China